Tranmere Rovers Football Club is an English association football club based in Birkenhead, Wirral. Founded in 1884, they played their first games under the name Belmont F.C.; in 1885, before the start of their second season, they adopted the name Tranmere Rovers. In 1889, Tranmere entered the West Lancashire League, and progressed through the Combination, the Lancashire Combination and the Central League. On 27 August 1921, as founder members of Division Three North, they won their first Football League match 4–1 against Crewe Alexandra at Prenton Park. Tranmere have played in the Football League ever since, with the exception of 1939–1946, when competitive football was suspended due to the Second World War. Their highest league finish was fourth in the First Division which, at the time, was the second tier of the league pyramid, in the 1992–93 season.

Players 
This list contains players who have appeared in nationally organised first-team competition for Tranmere from 1921 until the Second World War. It includes first-team appearances and goals in the Football League, the FA Cup and the Third Division North Cup. Appearances and goals in other competitions or non-competitive matches are not included. Statistics from the three games in the 1939–40 Football League season abandoned because of the Second World War have been expunged from the records and are not included. Players that also represented the club after the war are instead at List of post-war Tranmere Rovers F.C. players.

Notes

References 

General

  .

 

 

 

 

Specific

 
Lists of association football players by club in England
Association football player non-biographical articles